Halovibrio denitrificans is an extremely halophilic and denitrifying bacterium from the genus of Halovibrio which has been isolated from sediments from a hypersaline lake from Central Asia.

References

Oceanospirillales
Bacteria described in 2006